Natasha Michell Owens (née, Harlow; born May 20, 1976) is an American Christian musician, who primarily plays a contemporary Christian style of contemporary worship music. She released I Made it Through, in 2013, and No One but You, in 2015.

Early life
Natasha Michell Harlow was born on May 20, 1976, to father Herbert Michael Wayne Harlow, and to mother Sharon Darlene Harlow (née, Murrell). She grew up in Arlington, Texas, and relocated to Dallas, Texas, after she got married. Her father died of a self-inflicted involuntary gunshot wound to the chest on May 6, 2010, while he was cleaning one of his firearms. This was the basis for her first album.

Music career
Owens' music recording career commenced in 2013, with the studio album, I Made it Through, that was self-released, on May 18, 2013.
 Her second release, an extended play, No One but You, was released on August 28, 2015, independently. Natasha released her second studio album We Will Rise on July 7, 2017.
Owens released a third project, "Warrior," followed by a holiday album, "Christmas Memories" in the fall of 2020. Her album "Stand" is due out on August 6th, 2021

Personal life 
She married David Lynn Owens on April 5, 1995 in Fort Worth, Texas, just outside Dallas, where they reside. They have two sons, Nikolas Charles Owens and Brennan Gage Owens.

Discography
Studio albums
 I Made it Through (May 18, 2013, Independent)
 We Will Rise (July 7, 2017, Independent)
 Warrior (March 29, 2019)

EPs
 No One but You (August 28, 2015, Independent)

References

External links
 

1976 births
Living people
American performers of Christian music
Musicians from Dallas
Songwriters from Texas
21st-century American women musicians